Bacon Level is an unincorporated community located 3–4 miles (4.8 to 6.4 km) southeast of Roanoke, in Randolph County, Alabama, United States. Nearby churches include Bacon Level Baptist Church.

References

Unincorporated communities in Randolph County, Alabama
Unincorporated communities in Alabama